Bracha Jaffe is an Orthodox Jewish singer.

Music career
Jaffe began playing piano at four years old and would sing as well.  She later auditioned for Malky Giniger's Voices of Youth Choir.  In high school, she taught piano and gave voice lessons.

Jaffe began performing for local women’s events as a pregnant newlywed in nursing school. In line with her strict interpretation of Jewish law, Jaffe sings only with an all-female band and plays only for all-female audiences.  She also makes her social media accounts available only for female visitors.

2023 concert ban controversy
Jaffe is scheduled to play in concert on January 15, 2023 at Hackney Empire. In late 2022, various religious authorities banned girls from local Jewish schools from attending the event, and the Vaad L'maan Tohar Machneinu (group for the purity of our camp) branch of the Union of Orthodox Hebrew Congregations (UOHC) reportedly "endorses and supports this decision" to ban the concert.

Personal life
Jaffe was raised in Boro Park, Brooklyn, New York and lives there with her husband and five children.  For a time, she used to live in Far Rockaway.  She is a nurse practitioner.

References

 20th-century American singers